Arnott Harris (born 10 December 1909, date of death unknown) was a Barbadian cricketer. He played in one first-class match for the Barbados cricket team in 1934/35.

See also
 List of Barbadian representative cricketers

References

External links
 

1909 births
Year of death missing
Barbadian cricketers
Barbados cricketers
People from Saint Joseph, Barbados